Nothobranchius kafuensis, known as the Caprivi killifish or Kafue killifish, is a species of killifish in the family Nothobranchiidae. This killifish is found in temporary pools, swamps and ditches in the floodplains of the Kafue and Upper Zambezi rivers in western Zambia and the Caprivi Strip in Namibia.

References

Links
 Nothobranchius kafuensis on WildNothos 

kafuensis
Fish described in 1989
Freshwater fish of Namibia
Taxonomy articles created by Polbot